BVW may refer to:
 Batavia Downs Airport, IATA code: BVW
 Bordering Vegetated Wetland, a freshwater wetland that borders a creek, river, stream, pond, or lake; a wetland resource area defined in the Massachusetts Wetlands Protection Regulations (310 CMR 10.55)

bvw is the ISO 639-3 code of the Boga language

See also 
 BWV (disambiguation)